The Horse Lurja is a Georgian folktale about the friendship between a princess and a magic horse, which sacrifices itself for her after it rescues her from great peril. Although the tale appears in Georgia, some scholars recognize similar narratives in Central Asia and across Europe.

Summary
A king and a queen have a beautiful daughter. One day, an old witch tells the queen she and her husband can regain their youth if they kill their daughter and eat her liver and heart. The princess talks to her pet horse, Lurja, and confides in it about the murderous plan. The horse advises her to trick her parents: she is to ask the king and the queen to be dressed as a man and for her to take a ride on the horse to see the world before she dies.

It happens as the horse predicts and the princess seizes the opportunity to escape to another kingdom, in a male disguise. In this new kingdom, the king's son invites her to a hunt. The king's son suspects she is a girl, but his mother insists otherwise and tells him to test her: first by racing; then by going to the war treasury and choose what most appeals to a masculine mind.

The princess is eventually unmasked, but marries the king's son as she is. Her husband is invited as guest to another king, and borrows his wife's horse, Lurja. While he is away, she gives birth to a golden-haired son and writes a letter to him. A royal messenger takes the letter to deliver to the prince, but he spends the night in a house, where the contents of the letter are altered to say she gave birth to an abomination. The prince receives the letter and writes back that she and her son are to be kept safe until his return. The messenger passes by the same house, and the prince's letter is falsified with a command to burnt the princess and her son in an oven.

The horse Lurja senses that something is wrong with the princess and, despite one leg being tied to a pole, breaks free and races to the save the princess. He reaches the princess in the nick of time, on three legs, takes the princess and her son, and flies far away. At a safe distance, the horse realizes that being a three-legged beast is of no use to the princess, and urges her to kill it, place its three legs on three corners and its head in the middle. Reluctantly, she follows the horse's instructions and chants a spell; a temple is built in their place. The princess raises her son in this new place.

Meanwhile, the prince returns home and learns of the exchanged letters, and falls into despair, thinking that his wife and son were burnt in the oven. His father, the king, seeing his son's grief, decides to wander the world in search of his daughter-in-law and grandson. He eventually reaches the temple and meets his grandson and his mother.

Analysis

Tale type 
Georgian scholar T. Kurdovanitze identified a new tale type, not listed in the international Aarne-Thompson-Uther Index: a magical horse helps mother and son escape from burning and rides into the unknown with them; later, parts of its body (entrails, horsehide, etc.) transform into a castle to shelter mother and son, and her husband finds them.

This tale is classified by Georgian scholarship as an independent tale type in the Georgian Folktale Index, numbered -538*, "The Beauty and her Horse", with 12 variants listed.

Other regions 
In a 2013 article, researcher Veronica Muskheli, from University of Washington, took notice of a cycle of stories that she located in Central Asia. In this narrative, which she named Woman's Magical Horse, the heroine rides her magical horse to escape from a great evil, usually wears masculine clothes, and eventually finds a husband. The horse eventually perishes after helping the heroine one last time and she uses the horse's remains to build a new home for her.

According to Basque researcher , Italian folklorist  located stories of the crossdressing heroine, her helpful horse and the flight from a unwanted monstruous suitor in Italy, Catalonia and Basque Country - which corresponds to Type C in Lo Nigro's study.

In a study about the European cycle of La Doncella Guerrera ("The Warrior Maiden"), French historian  identified a second form of the cycle, which he termed La fille qui a épousé le diable (English: "The girl who married the devil"). In this form, the crossdressing heroine is still put to the test of her gender, but she is helped by her faithful magic horse. Delpech also concluded that the heroine's horse is the one that rescues her from a terrible marriage with a supernatural being and sets her up with a beneficial human partner.

Motifs
According to scholarship, the Georgian word lurǯa means a 'blue-gray' color.

According to Chilean folklorist , in some variants, the heroine is betrothed or already married to a gentleman (who is a devil in disguise), and escapes from him in a "Magical Flight" sequence. Despite the presence of the motif, these tales are not classified as type ATU 313, "The Magic Flight".

Relation to other tale types 
In an article in Enzyklopädie des Märchens, narrative researcher  stated that this narrative (heroine and magic horse save themselves from demonic bridegroom) may also start as tale type AaTh 621, "The Flea": her father, the king, fattens a louse and uses its hide as a suitor's riddle; a demonic bridegroom guesses it right.

Italian scholar Sebastian Lo Nigro, in his study, noted that the motif of the sequence of falsified letters harks back to tale type ATU 706, "The Maiden Without Hands".

Variants

Europe

Georgia
In a Georgian tale titled Arcivis švili and translated into Russian as "Сын орла" ("Eagle Son") or into German as Der Sohn des Adlers, a king has no children, until one day his wife gives birth to an eagle. The king orders for a hole to be excavated and the eagle to be thrown down there. The eagle is fed with oxen, and devours the royal cattle in no time. The king announces that the populace is to feed the bird with their cattle or, lacking it, with humans. One day, an orphan girl is selected as the next sacrifice and goes to her mother's grave to weep over her fate. The mother's spirit appears to the girl and advises her: she is to dress in a buffalo hide and ask the eagle prince to take off its skin. The girl obeys the instructions and is roped down the hole in a buffalo skin. The eagle watches her intently and orders her to take off her skin, but the girl retorts that the eagle should take off his first. The eagle obeys and sheds the birdskin to become a youth of so great a beauty he illuminates the hole. Some servants of the king fail to hear any screams, and go to check: the girl is still alive, and a youth is there as well, with no trace of the eagle. The servants tell the king, who does not believe them and has them executed. Then, the goes to check for himself and confirms the servants' story. He marries his son, now human, to the girl, and gives her a magical horse. One day, the prince has to journey to another city, and borrows his wife's magical horse. While he is away, his wife gives birth to a golden-haired boy, and writes a letter the tell her husband the good news. A royal messenger is given the letter to deliver to the prince, but spends the night in a house. A woman that lives in the house writes that the princess gave birth to a puppy. The messenger delivers the false letter, and the prince writes that she is to be protected until his return. The same messenger spends the night again at the same house, and the same woman takes the true letter and falsifies it with a command to take the princess and her son and burn them in an oven. The princess and her son are put in a chest and taken to the oven. However, her magical horse rushes to her, takes the chest out of the oven and rides with it to another land. The horse arrives at a desert and bursts open the chest, releasing mother and son. With no more strength, the horse tells the princess she can use its tail as a whip, so that, with every crack of the whip on the ground, the desert can be filled with flowers. The horse dies, and the princess follows the horse's instructions. Mother and son live out their days in this new land, and the boy grows up as a fine hunter. The tale then veers into tale type ATU 315, "The Faithless Mother".

Romania
Arthur Carl Victor Schott and Albert Schott collected a similar Romanian tale from Banat with the title Die Kaiserstochter und das Füllen ("The Kaiser's Daughter and the Foal"). A foal is born at the same day as a human princess. Both foal and princess become friends and companions. She feeds the horse with fire and wine. When she is 15 years old, her father, the emperor, decides it is time for her to marry, and sets a riddle for any suitors: he covers a drum with the skin of two fleas, and whoever guesses it right shall have the princess as wife. Many try, to no avail, until a powerful and wicked dragon, adept at magic arts, guesses it is made of louseskin (tale type ATU 857, "The Louseskin"). The princess confides in her pet horse about the horrible husband-to-be, but the horse advises her to ask her father to make three maale garments. The princess dress in male clothes and rides the horse to regions unknown, when she sees that the dragon is after her. The horse asks her what speed it should ride to elude the dragon: the speed of thought or the speed of wind, and the princess answers everytime the dragon is near. After they elude their pursuer, the princess arrives at a new realm, and the horse gives her a magic cushion to press whenever she feels she needs its help. In this new city, the princess offers her services to the emperor who rules the city, an old friend of her father, and gains his trust over time. And so rumours begin to spread among the emperor's advisers, who convince the emperor his new friend is an impostor, and a woman in man's garb. The emperor decides to test this theory - and the newcomer - by having his son accompany the youth to the marketplace (if he is a man, he will want to look at weaponry) and to the royal vineyard (if he is a man, he will eat the grapes raw). With her horse's advice, she avoids falling in their trap. However, as a third test, she is to get a bride for emperor: a princess locked in a glass castle on a glass hill, captive of a powerful wizard. The princess brings the maiden to the emperor and reveals them the whole truth. The emperor decides to marry his son to the princess, in the name of the frienshop between him and the girl's father. Some time later, war breaks out, and the emperor sends his son to fight. While he is away at war, his wife, the princess, gives birth to two golden boys. The royal messenger rushes to the battlefield to give a letter with the good news, and spends the night in an inn. A sequence of false letters leads the princess and her twin boys to be burned at the stake. The executioners lead the mother and children to the stake, and she presses the cushion she had with her. The magical horse rushes to her and inhales the fire to put it out. The princess sits on the horse with her children, and departs to regions unknown. At a safe distance, the horse tells her its time is at an end, and advises her that, after he dies, for her to cut his belly and spread its entrails to the four corners, its heart in the middle, and for her to sleep in its skin. The princes follows the horse's instructions and, the next day, a palace appears, with two lions as guards in front of the castle. Meanwhile, her husband goes back home, but does not find neither his wife, nor his children. Falling into a deep grief for the following years, the prince travels a bit, and sends a servant to find lodge for them. The messenger returns and points to a grand palace nearby, with two lions guarding it. The prince and his retinue go to the palace and find the mistress of the castle: his wife.

Moldova
Author Grigore Botezatu published a Moldavian tale titled Carminea (in the original, "Кырмыза" or Kyrmyza). In this tale, the titular Carminea is the beautiful daughter of a landlord. When she is 17 years old, her father places her daughter on a tower, and erects a staircase made of glass and precious stones, and sets a test for her suitors: they are to ride on horseback, jump high and get her ring from her hand. Many try, but a dragon riding a lion fulfills the test. Her father invites everyone to the betrothal party, but Carminea retires to the stables to confide in her pet horse Gaitan. The horse advises her to get rid of her unwanted suitor. The next day, the dragon suitor rides the lion, while Carminea lags behind. Following the horse's instructions, she decapitates the dragon in a surprise attack. She rides to a distant village and dresses up as a male rider to maintain the charade. A man named John befriends her and suspects she is a girl, so his grandmother advises him to put her through some tests: racing, finding use for the sticks in a cart, choosing between swords and yarns; and stepping on a besom placed in the doorway. Carminea passes through the first three tests, but is unmasked in the fourth one. She reveals her identity to John and they marry. However, John is drafted to war and joins the fray. After some time, Carminea is pregnant, and John writes home. He gives a letter to a friend to deliver it, and John's friends spends a night in a house - the house of the mother of the dead dragon suitor. She writes false command on the letter to burn Carminea at the stake. Gaitan tells her what to do: walk to her execution, then ride Gaitan into the fire, get a kerchief from its right ear and toss it in the fire. Carminea and Gaitan ride away to a valley near a spring. Carminea senses she is in labour, and Gaitan announces his time is over. Carminea sleeps, and the next morning awakes inside a great castle. The story then explains that parts the horse became parts of the castle: the body became the castle, the head became a table with dishes, its ears and eyes became two wolf hounds that guard the castle, the mane became a beautiful orchard, and one of its hooves turned into an old maidservant that helps Carminea in rearing her two golden-haired sons.

Kalmyk people
In a tale from the Kalmyk people with the title "О девушке, ставшей царицей, и о ее одиннадцати сыновьях" ("About the Girl who became a queen and her 11 sons"), girl Badma wears feminine clothes at home, but disguises herself as a youth when grazing with the herd. One day, a creature named mus breaks into her house and devours her parents, but she escapes with the help of a horse. Now orphan, she employs herself to a local khan still disguised as male, but the khan tries to reveal her female identity. After some attempts, her magical horse convinces her to tell her story to the khan, who falls in love with Badma. The khan expels his previous 500 Shulma wives and marries the girl. The next year, war erupts, and the khan departs with his wife's magical horse to fight, while she stays and gives birth to eleven sons with golden breast and silver backside. The previous Shulma wives intercept a letter and falsify it to tell the khan his wife gave birth to 11 puppies. The khan orders Badma and her elder son to be cast into the sea in a barrel. Their barrel washes ashore on an island. Badma's magical horse finds its rider and, to help her, the horse begs to be sacrificed and its remains to be distributed nearby. Saddened, they follow through with the instructions, and wake up in a white, carpeted kibitka. Later, the elder son shapeshifts into a sparrow to spy on his father's court, where the previous 500 Shulma wives comment on strange wonders: a beautiful woman that comes out of the water, and on a certain beach 10 youths with golden breast and silver backside come out of the sea to eat food on their golden plates.

Poland
Philologist and folklorist Julian Krzyżanowski, establisher of the Polish Folktale Catalogue according to the international index, located a similar narrative in Poland, which he dubbed type T 706A, "Królewna i źrebię" ("Princess and the Foal"). In the Polish tale, collected by folklorist Oskar Kolberg in Baranowa (Lubelskie) with the title Cudowne źrebię ("The Magical Foal"), a king has a beautiful daughter. He sets a test for any suitors (though many have failed and died): if anyone guesses the princess's name, they shall have the princess as bride. One day, the princess mutters to herself her own name (Marcybelo), which is heard by an evil spirit. The evil spirit disguises himself as a rich suitor and wins the princess as his bride. Before the princess leaves, she has a dream about a herd of horses just outside of the castle. Her dream is real, and one of the little foals of the herd follows the princess to her room. The foal warns the princess that her suitor is an evil spirit, and concocts a plan with her: when she is in the carriage on the way to the church, she shall sit on the right side and jump onto the foal. It happens so and she rides the horse to another castle, and jumps over a wall to a prince's garden. The gardener sees her and informs the prince, who takes her as his wife. The princess is taken to a summer palace to be more at ease, and gives birth to male twins. Her mother-in-law writes her son a letter about the good news, but the letters are intercepted and falsified by the evil spirit. The prince's mother reads the forged letter and carries out the false orders: the princess and her two children are to be burnt in a pyre. As she is led to her execution, the foal (which was locked in the stables) hurries to its master and whisks her away to safety. At a safe distance, on a vast meadow, the foal begs the princess to kill it, use its head to build a well and its ribs a city. The princess names the city "Marcybelin". Not long after, the prince, her husband, learns of the situation and goes to look for her with iron shoes and an iron cane.

Portugal
Portuguese scholars Isabel Cárdigos and Paulo Jorge Correia locate a similar tale type in the Portuguese Folktale Catalogue, numbered 533A, : the heroine marries a strange suitor, who turns out to be of evil nature; a horse takes her away in a magic flight to another kingdom, where she spends some time in male disguise; she reveals her identity and marries the prince; the prince goes to war; the heroine gives birth to her child and writes her husband a letter; the letters are falsified by the former suitor; the heroine escapes with her horse and the animal creates a new house for her and her child.

Portuguese author  published the tale O Conto da Infeliz Desgraçada (English: Tale from Alentejo of an Unfortunate Wretch) in his book . In this tale, an old king asks his fifteen year old daughter to find a husband. The princess hears a voice telling her to marry only a man with ivory teeth, and the king summons every man, until the ivory-toothed man comes to marry her. When she prepares to leave her castle to go with her husband, the princess (named Isabel) hears another voice coming from the stables. She goes to check it and finds a "cardano" horse with black mane that tells her to take the horse with her, lest something evil befalls her. It is agreed on, and Isabel rides the horse. After some 200 days journey, her husband disappears from view, and the horse advises her to ride to a small cottage. Isabel does and finds two straws and a piece of paper inside it that she takes with herself. The husband appears behind her, and the horse tells her to drop the objects behind her: the paper to create a mist, the first straw, filled with needles, to create a forest, and the second straw, filled with water, to create a river between them. Afte safely escaping from the ivory-toothed man, the horse advises Isabel to dress in male clothing, and to go to another court, where she will pass her off as a youth named José. The second king tries to buy "José"'s horse, but he refuses. Later, after suspecting the newcomer is truly a woman, he plots with an old lady how to unmask her: to have her choose sits at the dining table, and to join him in his bedchambers. José passes the first test, but reveals her true identity in the king' room and marries him. Some years later, the king has to go to war and borrows Isabel's horse, while she stays at the palace and gives birth to two sons. A king's messenger takes a letter and runs to the battlefield to deliver it, but spends the night at an inn, where the innkeeper writes a false letter. The king receives the false letter and writes another, that is also forged by the innkeeper, with a command to banish her from the palace. Isabel receives the sad news and, despite bemoaning her fate, leaves the palace with her sons and wanders around the world. Suddenly, her cardano horse appears to her, having fled from the battlefield, and alerts her that her first bridegroom is after her, but the horse will do battle against him; after the horse perishes, Isabel is to get whatever she finds inside his mouth. It happens so: the princess takes the horse's tongue, throws it on the ground and a tower appears to house her and her children. Back to the king, he returns from war, learns about the forged letters, and decides to look for his wife. He stops by the same inn, and meets an old man that is also looking for her. Both decide to look for Isabel together and find her tower. They are welcomed inside, and, after dining with Isabel and her sons, she introduces her children to her father and her husband.

Basque Country
Author Wentworth Webster collected a Basque language tale named Zorria ("The Flea") from Saint-Jean-de-Luz, which was published by French linguist Julien Vinson with the title Le Pou ("The Flea"). In this tale, a king has three daughters. One day, his youngest daughter finds a flea in his hair. The king fattens the bug, kills it and uses its hide as part of a riddle for the princess's suitors. A gentleman wearing gold garments (the devil in disguise) guesses it right and is given the hand of the youngest princess, named Fifine, in marriage. Fifine goes to the stables and a white mare warns her that her suitor is the devil, and that, as parting gift, the princess must choose to take the mare with her. It happens so. On the road, the white mare trots the ground, and it commands the earth to swallow the devil for seven years. The mare's enchantment works, and Fifine is saved, but the animal advises her to dress in masculine clothes and go to another kingdom. In this new kingdom, Fifine and the white mare find shelter in a prince's castle. The prince tells his mother he had a dream their guest is a woman, and the queen advises him to test her: to make her choose guns and weapons at the market, to have her horse trample on a piece of linen, and to take a bath in the river. With the mare's help, Fifine passes the tests, but eventually reveals herself to the prince and marries him. The white mare gives Fifine a chirola, for her to use in extreme distress, and departs. Fifine and the prince live in relative peace and harmony for seven years, and she gives birth to a boy and a girl. One day, her husband has to go to war and leaves her with his mother. While he is away, the devil rises from the ground and meets Fifine and her children, and takes them to the forest. Fifine begs for him to grant her a last request, and she blows on the chirola. The white mare appears to her, stomps on the ground and the devil disappears for good. Fifine decides not to return to her mother-in-law's castle, so the mare gives her a magic cane for her to create a manor if she strikes the ground with it. Fifine's husband returns from war and, not seeing his family, looks for them in the forest. He finds the manor with Fifine and their children inside. Its mission accomplished, the white mare turns into a white dove and flies to Heaven. Webster presumed a French origin for the tale, due to the heroine's name (Fifine), and claimed that the tale was from "Laurentine, Sister of Toutou". The tale was also translated into English as Fifine and the White Mare and its second part, Fifine and the Prince, and both sourced from Gascony, France.

Spain 
In her catalogue of Spanish sources, scholar Montserrat Amores reports few variants of Spanish type 533A, "El Caballo Mágico salva a la novia del Diablo" (English: "Magic Horse saves girl from the Devil"), in Spain.

In this tale, a princess named Iria does not want to marry anyone. One day, a horse in the stables, named Boligan, calls for her and advises her to tell her father she wants to marry a man with perfect ivory teeth, hoping that such a man does not exist. However, a man with this exact trait, a rich and powerful Moor, appears in the kingdom and asks to marry her. The princess cries over her fate, but the horse counsels her to take the horse with her. Some days into their journey, something startles the Moor's mount and he falls to the ground, allowing Iria to flee on her mount. She rides to a distant hut and rests with a old woman, who, the next day, gives the princess a tuft of sheep wool and a stack of needles. Iria journeys on, when her fiancé, the Moor, rides just behind them. Boligan, the horse, tells the princess to throw behind her the old woman's objects to delay the pursuit: the wool creates a mist and the needles great boulders. The third time, she throws behind her a piece of silk, creating a lake to deter the Moor. At a safe distance, the horse advises her to buy male clothes, take on a male name, Payo, and to find work as a king's page. The second king suspects Payo is a girl underneath the disguise and tries to unmask her by setting tests: to catch an apple between her legs; and to stay by the king's bed at night. Her horse, Boligan, however, warns her against every attempt. Eventually, Iria reveals herself and marries the king. Time passes, and a Moor army is at the king's door; Iria's husband, the king, borrows Boligan and marches to battle, leaving her at the castle. Iria notices that her former fiancé, the Moor, is leading the army, and gives birth to twin boys "like two suns". Her mother-in-law writes her son a letter with the good news, but a series of forged missives force the king's mother to carry out false orders to kill her. Crying, Iria takes her sons and leaves the kingdom, hoping to reach her father's homeland. One morning, she wakes up and sees her loyal horse Boligan in front of her. The horse tells her the Moorish king will come after her, but Boligan will fight him to the death; in case he dies, Iria is to take whatever she finds in his mouth. Just as the horse predicted, the Moor comes to kill her, but Boligan kills him in a fierce battle, and perishes, his form reverting to a human shape. Iria mourns for her fallen friend, gets his tongue and tosses it on the floor; a stone tower appears to house her and her children, furnished with everything they need. Back to Iria's husband, he returns home and, learning of the changed letters, begins a journey in search of her. He meets a long-bearded old man, and both ride to the stone tower. Inside, Iria welcomes them and, after dinner, embraces the king as her husband and the old man as her father.

Researcher Marisa Rey-Henningsen collected a tale from a Galician source which she translated as The Countess's Daughter and The Talking Horse. In this tale, Floriña is the daughter of a rich woman who is a countess. Many men have courted her, but her mother does not want to surrender her to any man. Even a powerful Moorish king makes a bid for the girl's hand, and threatens to kill both mother and daughter if they do not agree to it. Floriña weeps, and walks a bit with her mother's horse, which begins to talk. It advises Floriña that she shall only marry a man with perfectly white teeth, white as the freshly fallen snow. The Moorish king says he is that man, and gets to marry Floriña. The horse laments that their initial plan failed, so it suggests the girl takes her mother's horse with her to her new home. On the journey to the Moorish king's house; the horse seizes the opportunity to bump into the moor and his horse, and gallops away with Floriña to a Christian king's land. In the Christian king's castle, Floriña trades her womanly clothes for a peasant's and a cap. She works as a page in the second king's castle, and the king suspects she is a woman, and not a man. The Christian king's mother advises him to test the page: ask him to show his hands (either their palms, if a man), throw him a bunch of kindlewood (he will catch it between his legs if a man), and finally to ask him to sleep with him in his bed. Floriña passes by the first two tests, and begins to undress herself to join the king in his bed, when they hear a commotion in the streets: the Moorish king comes back with an army in search of his wife. The Christian king tries to deter him, but the Moor kills him, and goes after Floriña. She escapes from the attack and calls out for her mother's horse, and the animal rides to her aid. They gallop together across a field of dead bodies, both Christians and Moors, and the animal advises her to take its tongue in the hour of dire need. The horse stops by the side of a bridge, the Moor king on the other side. The Moor changes into a sparrow hawk to fly over the water and reach Floriña, and the horse warns the girl to cut off its tongue. In a rapid movement, the girl grabs a knife, cuts off the horse's tongue and throws it on the ground: a solid tower springs up to protect her, while the horse fights the Moor. The Moor stabs the horse in the neck with his sword, and it falls to the ground. The horse changes into a human prince, and, in the confusion, takes the sword to kill the Moor. From inside the tower, Floriña sees the battle and climbs down the tower to help the man. She brings him inside the tower, dresses his wounds and restores him to full health. Despite him not talking at all, Floriña begins to fall in love with him, and, one day, kisses him: the tower disappears and the man regains his speech, telling the girl a wicked fairy cursed him to an equine shape. Floriña and the man journey back to her mother's land, where she learns her mother died of grief, but later she marries the man.

Italy 
Folklorist Domenico Comparetti collected a tale titled Il drago ("The Dragon") from Pisa, which was later published by author Italo Calvino with the title The Dragon and the Enchanted Filly (Italian: Il Drago e la cavallina fatata). In this tale, a childless king and queen pray to God for a son until they are expecting one. After the prince's birth, an astrologer predicts he will marry by his twentieth year and kill his wife, otherwise he will turn into a dragon. The royal couple become gravely worried about their son's future, but he lives out his days until he is 20 years old, when they arrange a marriage between him and the queen of England. The queen of England, however, has a magical talking filly who tells the queen about her betrothed's fate, and plots with her to have her ride on horseback to church. Following the filly's instructions, the queen rides to church and holds tight to the horse's neck; they ride like lightning away from the prince who, just as foretold, becomes a dragon. Back to the queen, the filly advises her to trade her royal clothes with a farmer, and to work as a stableboy in a nearby kingdom. The queen obeys. In this second kingdom, the king's son suspects the new stableboy is a female, and sets some tests to prove his gender: to have him make a bouquet of flowers, to cut the bread a certain way, and to practice fence with him. With the filly's advice, the queen of England avoids revealing her gender, but she does anyway and marries the king's son. After a while, war breaks out, and the king's son borrows the queen of England's filly as his mount. Before they depart, the filly gives the queen three hairs of its mane to use in an emergency. While the king's son is away at war, the queen gives birth to "beautiful" twins, and writes her husband a letter. The messenger, however, is intercepted by the now draconic prince, who falsifies a sequence of letters that culminates with the queen and her children being orders to be burned at a pyre. The queen's mother-in-law decides to spare them and sets them adrift on a boat with provisions, while they burn dummies in the pyre. Now adrift at sea, the dragon is ready to attack the queen of England and her children, butshe breaks out each of the filly's three hairs to create magic obstacles: first, a thicket, then a wide river and a mighty fire, but the dragon goes through each one. To the queen's relief, her friend, the filly, appears in the nick of time to battle to the dragon to the death: the dragon dies, but so does the filly. The queen cries over her dead friend, but notices that a castle appeared nearby. A woman at a window signs the queen to enter it, and welcomes her, saying she is the filly, but now her enchantment was over since she killed the dragon. Back to the king's son, he returns from war and learns of the false letters, and decides to sail the seas until he finds his wife. He sails to the shore where he sees the dead bodies of the dragon and the filly, and the castle in the distance, where he reunited with his family.

Asia
In their commentaries to the tales collected by the Grimm Brothers, European scholars Johannes Bolte and Jiri Polívka noted similarities between Turkish tale Kamer-Taj, der Mondross and Kyrgyz (sic) tale Dudar Kys, and the connection between both stories to the German tale Die Mädchen ohne Hände ("The Maiden Without Hands").

Turkey
Folklorist Ignác Kúnos published a similar tale from Turkey, with the title A hold-paripa, translated as Kamer-Taj, der Mondross, or the Moon-Horse. In this tale, a padishah fattens a flea for it to grow large, skins it and uses its leather as part of a riddle: whoever guesses it right, shall marry his daughter. A dev guesses it right and takes the padishah's daughter as his bride. The padishah's daughter mounts on her father's horse, Kamer-Taj or Moon-Horse, and it rides with the girl to a garden in a palace in another island. The prince who lives in this palace sees the horse and the princess and mistakes her for a peri. The girl explains she escaped from a horrible mistake of a wedding, and marries the prince. Some time later, war breaks out, and the prince goes in his father's stead. While the prince is away at war, his wife gives birth to a boy and a girl, but a sequence of forged letters by the dew threatens to destroy the girl and her children. After reading the false letters, the princess leaves the palace with her children. Lost in the world, the dew finds her and tries to kill her children. The princess cries out for her horse Kamer-Taj to help her, and the horse races to its mistress. Kamer-Taj takes them as far away as possible, to his own country. With no more strength in his body, Kamer-Taj asks the girl to use its head and entrails to magically build a palace for her and her children. In a monograph published posthumously, French comparativist Emmanuel Cosquin compared the Basque tale Le Pou with the Turkish Kamer-tag (sic) and concluded, based on the great paralells of both tales, that their relationship was "incontestable" ("indubitable", in the original).

Kurdish people 
Kurdologists Ordîxanê Jalîl, Celîlê Celîl and Zine Jalil collected a similar story from the Kurdish people. In this tale, titled "Зэль­фи­наз и Джэль­фи­фараз" ("Zelfinaz and Jelfifaraz"), a padishah laments that he has neither a son, nor a daughter. A dervish appears and gives him an apple: half to be given to his wife, and half to his mare, so that a daughter and a foal are born at the same time, and they are only to be named in his presence. The padishah agrees with the man's terms and takes the apple. Some time later, a girl is born to him, and a foal to his mare. When she is of age, the old man appears again and names the girl Zelfinaz and the horse Jelfifaraz, and asks the padishah to not reveal their names, but to give his daughter along with the horse to anyone who can guess their names. A dev learns of this, and sends his grayhound to spy on the princess and gather information. The grayhound comes back with the correct names, and the dev appears in court to answer the riddle. He guesses them correctly and takes the princess as his wife and her horse with him. Zelfinaz is given masculine clothes, and the horse - whom she calls "her brother" - hatches a plan with her: they will trick the dev, hit him and escape. It happens so: Jelfifaraz takes Zelfinaz to another king's palace, where she, in a man's garments, becomes the companion of the prince. The prince and his mother argue about whether or not his newfound companion is a woman, and she sets tests for "him": to drink wine and not get drunk, and to sleep on a branch of roses. With her horse's advice, she passes on both tests, but fails when she is put to the drinking test again: she is taken by the king's son to her chambers and undresses; the king's son realizes she is a girl, and sleeps by her side. The next morning, Zelfinaz wakes up and goes to see her "brother", the horsse, and apologizes for not talking to him the night before. The horse assuages her feats and tells her she has found has happiness. Time passes, and Zelfinaz marries the king's son. One day, her husband wants to go to the hajj and take Jelfifaraz with him. Despite some reservations, Zelfinaz agrees to let her husband take the horse with him. While he is away, she gives birth to two golden-haired sons, and her mother-in-law writers the prince a letter with the good news. However, the spurned dev strikes again, and forges a series of letters that cause Zelfinaz's exile with her children: she is given provisions for 40 days and nights, and put on a boat. She reaches a shore and laments her fate. Her brother, the horse, appears to her, and tells her to sacrifice him: cut open his insides and scatter them to create a garden, then clean his body and enter inside with her children. Jelfifaraz perishes, and Zelfinaz follows his orders. The next day, she wakes up in a palace. Safe for now, she raises her twin sons. Meanwhile, back to the prince, he learns of the false letters and begins a journey to find Zelfinaz. He takes a boat and sails the waters, until he reaches the same shore and finds Zelfinaz's palace, with their children inside.

Turkestan
German-Bohemian folklorist  published a tale from Turkestan with the title Der Zauberross ("The Magic Horse"). At one point in the story, the titular magic horse saves its rider, a princess, and her two children, and rides into a distant land. Sensing its approaching death, it asks the princess to use its body parts to create a palace for her and her children. In his commentaries, Jungbauer noted that this tale resembled both the Turkish Kamer-Taj and Kazakh Dudar-Kyz. Psychologist Marie-Louise von Franz sourced the tale The Magic Horse from Uzbekistan.

Buryat people
In a tale from the Buryat with the title "Девушка и говорящий бархатисто-черный конь" or "Хэли мэдэдэг хэлин х хара моритой басаган" ("The Girl and her talking silky black horse"), a maiden lives with her parents, who are visited by a man named Badarchi Lama. He convinces the girl's parents to expel her from home, under the pretense that she is an evil spirit. The maiden is helped by a talking horse and escapes before her parents do anything to her. With the horse's help, she competes in a male-only tournament (a ploy by the khan to unmask his prophecised daughter-in-law). As the tale continues, the virago maiden gives birth to a boy with golden breast and silver backside, and her husband takes her magical horse to help him in a war. The same Badarchi Lama intercepts the royal mail and falsifies a letter with an order to dig a hole and bury queen and son inside it. They carry out the order, but the magical black horse, back from the war, rescues them out of the pit and escapes with both to the distant mountains. Now at a safe distance, the horse tells them he is about to expire, and says his remains (bones, skin, head) can help the pair.

Mongolia
In a Mongolian tale translated as "Жеребёнок-спаситель" ("The Saviour Colt"), an old couple have a beautiful daughter. They also have a mare with no foal, and a tree with no fruit. One day, the old man sees that the mare has foaled and the tree yielded fruit. His daughter wants to see the foal, but her father tells her to see it tomorrow. In the middle of the night, the daughter sneaks out to see the foal, which is of a bay colour, and eats the fruits from the tree. Suddenly, the horse talks to her and says the mangas will come in the night, and they should escape. The daughter agrees and takes with her a comb and a whetstone, as per the horse's instructions. She rides the horse and accidentally drops the compb to create a sea of boiling water in front of them. The horse jumps over the sea and tells her to throw the whetstone behind them. Eventually, they reach another kingdom. The horse explains that, in this kingdom, the khan and the khansha are looking for a bride for their son. The horse suggests that she will become the wife of the khan's son, and reminds her to not allow her husband to ride it, nor fetter it with iron chains. The girl marries the khan's son. One day, the girl is pregnant, and the khan's son has to depart on a three year journey. He and asks if he can borrow her horse. She agrees to lend the horse to her husband, but asks him to not put the horse in iron fetters. While he is away, she gives birth to a son, and writes her husband a letter. The letter is intercepted by the mangas. The horse races back to the girl and her son, and tells her to mount him, for the mangas are coming for her. The horse races to the middle of the vast steppe, and tells the girl he will son perish. However, she can use his four legs to create four aspens (one of gold, one of silver, one of pearls and one of coral), and his body to become a sea. The horse also gives her four golden hairs of its mane. After the horse dies, the girl uses its legs and body to create an island in the middle of a sea, with four aspens. She climbs up the golden aspen, when suddenly the mangas comes and gnaws at the tree trunk to fell it down. The girl and her son jump to the silver one, then the coral one, and finally to the pearl one, the mangas destroying the other aspens until there is only the pearl one. In the nick of time, two dogs cross the sea and attack the mangas, ripping it to pieces. The girl traverses the sea with the dogs and recognizes a man on a horse: it is her husband, who has come to rescue her.

In another Mongolian tale translated as Die achtzehnjährige Aigalzoo ("Eighteen-year-old Aigalzu"), a prince and a princess have a beautiful daughter namd Aigalzu, whom they raised in a glass house to protect her from the world. When she comes of age, they decide to marry her, and set a test for any potential suitors: to guess her name and age. A poor monk discovers her name and guesses it right. Her mother and father lament this situation, since a monk's life is a hard one. She takes with her a mirror shard, a flint and a comb, and goes to live with the monk. After three years, she decides to visit her parents, and escapes from the monk. Her husband pursues her, and she throws the mirror shard, the flint and the comb to create magical obstacle to hinder the pursuit. She takes shelter with an old woman, who adopts her as her child, since the old woman's son died in the war fighting for another prince. Aigalzu finds the old woman's dead son's bow and arrow, and is given a talking horse. The old woman talls the girl the prince visits her once a month and must not know she is a girl, so she needs to dress in masculine clothes. Her horse also advises Aigalzu to act masculine and show interest in masculine activities. Eventually she is unmasked and marries the prince. One day, the prince has to travel abroad and asks Aigalzu to borrow her horse. The horse agrees to be lent, but the prince must not tie him in iron chains. Aigalzu gives birth to a boy and her mother-in-law writes her son a letter with the good news. However, the letter is intercepted by the same monk Aigalzu spurred once. the monk falsifies a series of letters, which culminates with Aigalzu and her son escaping from the palace on her talking horse. During the ride, she realizes that one of the horse's legs is stripped bare of its flesh, due to the iron chains the horse was fettered to. At a certain distance, the horse loses its strength and tells Aigalzu, after it dies, to use its eyes to create two ravens, its ears to create two foxes, its nostrils to create two tigers, its four legs to create four sandal trees, its skin to create a verdant meadow, its heart and liver to create a rock, and its blood to create a red sea. She obeys the horse's instructions. Some time later, the monk appears in the meadow. Aigalzu and her son climb the four sandal trees to escape from the monk, who chops down each tree with an axe.

Nanai people
Researcher Kira Van Deusen collected a Nanai tale from storyteller Anna Petrovna Khodzher. In her tale, titled Endohochen, two sisters live together. One day, a creature named Endohochen steals the tongue of one of the sisters. One night, she has a dream about an old woman. The old woman tells her she will give her a white horse, and that she can get her own tongue back. Eventually, she gets her tongue back and  escapes on the white horse to a village. The girl, named Pudin, marries a man named Mergen and bears him a son. Endohochen goes after her, and Pudin cries out for the white horse to save her. The horse races to her with all its might, and takes her away. At a safe distance, the horse tells her he has lost all his strength, and asks Pudin to kill him and wrap his skin around her and the baby. She follows the horse's request and sleeps in the horsekin. When she wakes up, Pudin notices she is now in a fine house. Van Deusen noted that the name of the heroine, Pudin (or Pudi, and Fudin), is given to the heroine in Nanai tales; that the narrative sequence with the horse is similar to "epic heroines among the Turks and Mongols", and that the episode of the exchanged letters is reminiscent of the European tale The Handless Maiden.

Nepal
In a tale from Nepal with the title "ДЕВУШКА И БРАТЬЯ-ДЕМОНЫ" ("The Girl and the Demon-Brothers"), a mother has a beautiful daughter that is wooed by many suitors, but she refuses every romantic advance. One day, three demon brothers disguise themselves as humans and try to court tbe girl. Her mother agrees to their courtship, but first they have to guess her daughter's name. The demon brothers ask a hare, a fox and a magpie if they can spy on the girl and her mother. The hare and the fox fail, but the magpie learns: "Flower of Paradise". They guess it right and the mother gives her daughter to the demon brothers. As a parting gift, the mother gives her daughter a white horse. Flower of Paradise lives a hellish marital life: every chore is thrust on her, and she is chastised for everything. One day, while the demon brothers are away, she opens a door and sees a pile of human bones. She cries that she may share such grim fate, but her mother's voice, coming from her apron, tells her to take the white horse and escape. She wears the apron on her to take the shape of an old lady and flees with the horse to another kingdom. There, she takes the job as a servnant in the palace. As her pastime, she goes to the river, takes off the apron, and combs her hair by the water. A shepherd notices the beautiful girl at the river, and tells the monarch about it. The monarch goes to the river and sees Flower of Paradise. He learns of her story and marries her. Some time later, he has to travel afar, to the other side of his dominions. While he is away, Flower of Paradise gives birth to a boy and writes her husband a letter. The messenger takes the letter and journeys to meet the monarch, but stops by a tree where three men are drinking wine. By getting the messenger drunk, the three men - the demon brothers - discover the location of Flower of Paradise and falsify the messenger's letters. Flower of Paradise receives a false letter with a message to get her son and leave the kingdom. Wondering about the strange letter, she decides to obey it anyway and departs with her son on the white horse. The white horse stops at a desert and asks Flower of Paradise to kill him, and spread his skin, bones and hooves on the four corners, and his mane around it. She obeys the horse's orders and, the next day, she and her son wake up in comfortable beds in a grand palace. Eventually, the monarch finds Flower of Paradise and their son in the grand palace. At the end of the tale, they are visited by three men, which Flower of Paradise recognizes as the demon-brothers, by looking at a scar on the hand of one of the men. The girl plots with her husband how to get rid of the demon brothers: they dig out a hole in the ground, draw the demon brothers there. They fall inside, and Flower of Paradise's servants close the hole on the demons.

Tibet 
According to Hungarian orientalist László L. Lőrincz, professor Damdinsuren published a Tibetan language translation of The Bewitched Corpse, titled Ro-sgruṅ. Its tenth tale is titled, in the original, Bu-mo So-kha 'di-li sman-čaṅ šes rtas srin-mo'i lag-nas bral-te rgyal-srid sprad-pa'i le'u žugs (French: Comment la fille So-kha 'di-li sman-čaṅ échappa à l'aide du cheval fée au démon et obtint le trône; English: "How the girl So-kha 'di-li sman-čaṅ escaped from the devil with the help of a magical horse and gained the throne"). Lörincz also provided an abridged summary of the tale: a demon in disguise guesses the true name of the girl with the help of a fox and they marry; So-kha 'di-li sman-čaṅ rides her own magical horse away from him and marries a human king; while the king is away at war, she gives birth to a boy and writes her husband a letter; the letter is intercepted and falsified by the demon, who goes after them; the magical horse saves So-kha 'di-li sman-čaṅ and her son.

Tibetologist  published a similar tale in the compilation "Игра Веталы с человеком" ("Vetala's Game with a Man"), with the title "Три брата-демона" ("The Three Demon Brothers"), sourced from Tibet. Author James Riordan translated the tale to English as Lotus Blossom (also the heroine's name), and also sourced it from Tibet.

Kazakhstan
In a Kazakh tale translated into Hungarian with the title A fakó lovacska ("The White Horse"), a rich man has much cattle and properties, but no children. People wonder why the man has not suffered any cattle theft, and attribute his success to a white horse he owns. One day, he is invited to the khan's banquet, but cannot sit anywhere since he has no son, nor daughter. he and his wife make a cattle offering and prays to God for a child. In a vision, a voice tells him that if he performs a certain deed, he will be granted a daughter. So a daughter is born to him. Years later, she proclaims she is her own master, and becomes a beautiful young woman that is courted by many suitors. She sets a riddle for her suitor: they are to guess her name. She tells her parents her name is Dudar Kyz. One day, when her caravan moves from place to place, the name Dudar Kyz is shouted, and the girl thinks someone called her. Some time later, a suitor comes to guess her name, and gets it right. Before she leaves with her bridegroom, she talks to her white horse about the bridegroom. The horse reveals the bridegroom is a wicked wolf that took on human shape, and he advises her go ask her father for a bow and arrow, a black servant  on a black camel, and the white horse to take with her new home. She rides the white horse to her new home, her suitor ahead of her. He becomes a wolf, devours the black camel and turns back to human. They reach his tent, and his elder wife asks to tie Dudar's horse. Dudar's declines and ties the horse outside the yurt, and remains there. While her husband wakes up screaming for Dudar Kyz, the girl, still outside, dons male clothing and goes with the horse far away from the tent. She meets another youth during a hunt. She kills two animals as game for herself, and the youth, named Tostuk, is so impressedby the feat he suggests they become brothers. Tostuk takes Dudar Kyz (in male disguise) to his tent, and his mother suspects her son's new friend is a girl. Dudar Kyz and Tostuk take part in a test set by another khan: whoever shoots a bag of money atop a tree, shall marry his daughter. Dudar Kyz wins and marries the khan's daughter. Dudar Kyz brings the khan's daughter with her to Tostuk's tent, and ponders about her situation. Her white horse advises her to reveal the truth to Tostuk. Dudar Kyz invites Tostuk to a ride in the steppe and shows him her true identity. Tostuk accepts her and marries both her and the khan's daughter. Some time later, war erutpts, and Tostuk is drafted, just as Dudar Kyz falls pregnant. Tostuk tells his mother to look after his wife and to name his son Altyn-Báj, takes Dudar Kyz's horse and rides to battle. While he is way, Dudar Kyz gives birth to a boy with golden head and silver chest. Her mother-in-law writes a letter to her son for a man to deliver it to him. The messenger gets the letter, but stops at a house that belongs to a bony witch, the mother of Dudar Kyz's rejected suitor. The messenger delivers Tostuk's mother's letter to him, and he writes a response. The messenger passes by the bony witch's house again and she falsifies Tostuk's response, writing a command to take Dudar Kyz and her son and burn them. Dudar Kuz reads the letter and cries. She hears the trot of her white horse. The animal comes, his legs badly hurt, and tells her to take Altyn-Báj and come with him. The horse rushes to whatever destination they can reach, and the bony witch appears to chase her. Dudar Kyz throws behind her a comb, which becomes a forest to delay the witch. Then, she drops a mirror and it becomes a lake. Dudar Kyz and the horse fall into the lake, and the bony witch grabs her arm. Dudar Kyz cuts her horse's belly; the horse striks the witch with his hind legs; the witch lets go of her and sinks into the lake. At the other margin, the white horse, sensing his approaching death, asks Dudar Kyz to use his legs to create a herd of horses, and his chest to create a large white yurt for her and her son. After the horse perishes, she grieves for him three days, then follows his instructions: a yurt appears before the girl, where she raises her son Altyn-Báj. Eventually, Tostuk finds his wife and son again, after many years, and the family is reunited.

Kyrgyzstan
Turkologist Vasily Radlov first collected the tale Dudar Kys in the late 19th century, and sourced it from Kyrgyzstan.

In another tale sourced from Kyrgysztan and collected in Turgay with the title "Волкъ-женихъ" ("Wolf Bridegroom"), a rich old man wants to marry his daughter, Ганиф (Hanif), to a possible suitor, but sets a test for them: he fashions a pair of gloves of louseskin, and any suitor must guess their material. Hanif complains to a friend about the louseskin gloves, but their conversation is overheard by two wolves. The wolves shapeshift into humans and go to the rich man's tent to win Hanif. One of the human wolves answers correctly and prepares to take the girl to his own yurt. After moving out to her bridegroom's yurt, Hanif discovers her bridegroom and his friend are wolves. Her horse warns her to take a ring and a brooch from the yurt and escape. Hanif throws behind the items and misses her pursuers. Now at a distance, the horse feels it cannot go on, and urges Hanif to kill it, eat his flesh and drink his blood, spill the rest of the blood around her, rip open its belly and extract its entrails. She then needs to cover herself in the horse's belly and hold its right leg next to her. Hanif refuses to fulfill her horse's dying request, but eventually does it. The next morning, the horse's belly becomes a magnificent kibitk, the horse leg becomes a handsome youth and the drops of blood all around her becomes a nation of people that choose her as their ruler.

Iran
Researcher Adrienne Boulvin reported an Iranian tale from Meched (Mashhad, formerly in the Khorasan province, modern day Razavi Khorasan province), wherein a king prepares a riddle for any suitor with a lousekin: they must guess what the material of a certain object is, and they shall marry the princess. A div guesses it right and takes the princess as his bride. With the help of a magic horse, she escapes from the div, who tries to get her. To delay his pursuit, the princess throws behind her a needle to create a field of needles, a bit of salt to create a cover of salt, and waterjug to create a sea between them. The princess manages to escape on the magic horse, and the tale ends.

Uzbekistan
In an Uzbek tale titled "Черный волшебный конь" ("The Black Magic Horse"), collected by Uzbek folklorist Muzayyana Alaviya, a padishah suffers for not having any child, until a qalander comes to his palace and predicts he shall father a girl, and warns him he shall not deny anything she asks of him. The qalander gives the padishah an apple, whose half the padishah eats and his wife the other half. They have a daughter they call Mushkiya ("fragrant"). One day, the maidservants find a louse in her hair. Mushkiya decides to fatten it, skin it and make a carpet as part of a suitor riddle. To keep the secret, Mushkiya orders her nanny to be taken to desert. Out of pity, another servant simply abandons the nanny in the desert and brings back a bloodied kerchief. Still in the desert, the "Wolf King" approaches her and she tells the answer to the princess's riddle. The Wolf King and his pack come to the palace to woo the princess, and he guesses it right. The  padishah shames his daughter for such a foolish whim, but she says she will consult with a vizier. The vizier advises her to get a magic black horse - inherited from her ancestors - from the stables, a whip and garments; follow the wolf to its den on a horse, but not dismout it, then ride the horse towards any unknown destination. Mushkiya rides the magic black horse after her wolf suitor to its cave, and before she dismounts, she puts her plans into action: pretending to "exorcize" evil spirits from the wolf's cave, she whips her horse three times, each time the horse soaring high in the sky, then flying away. Meanwhile, in another kingdom, a widowed kingdom is told by his wiseman that his future bride will come in a flying horse. The king meets the rider on the flying horse, and thinks they are male, instead of his prophesied bride. The king mistakes him for a male rider and tries to unmask her by some tests: by sitting next to him, and bathing in the river. Eventually, the king falls ill with love for the girl and she reveals herself. Mushkiya and the king marry. Some time later, the king has to leave on a misson around the kingdom, and leaves his wife to the court's care. After nine months, Mushkiya gives birth to male twins, Hassan and Husan, and the vizier writes him a letter. A messenger is assigned to take the letter to the king, but stops to rest by a lodge on the way. After the messenger delivers the true letter to the king, he passes by the same lodge, where the owner's daughter - a spurned suitor to the king - changes the king's missive for a false command to burn Mushkiya and her children at the stake. The vizier receives the letter and despite doubting its contents at first, decides to carry out the orders. Before the queen is burnt, her magic black horse takes her and the children elsewhere. At a safe distance, the horse says he is dying, and asks Mushkiya to bury his eyes to create two springs, his ears to create gates, strips of its skin to create a fortress-city and its mane to grant greater fortune. The horse dies, and Mushkiya separates its body parts;. Overnight, an entire fortified city appears to her, where she lives with the twins. Meanwhile, the king returns from his mission and, thinking his wife and sons are dead, decides to wander about as a beggar. He eventually goes to the new fortified city that appeared overnight and finds his wife and children. After a joyous reunion, the family is separated again: Mushkiya is kidnapped by a caravan; while trying to cross a river, the king loses both Hassan and Husan, and washes up in another kingdom; Hassan is stolen by a wolf, but saved by a huntsman; Husan is swallowed by a fish, but is saved by a fisherman. At the end of the tale, after a long time of separation, the family is reunited for good.

Khanty people 
In a tale from the Khanty people collected in 1978 and published in 1990 with the title "Золотой конь" ("Golden Horse"), a girl finds a golden louse in her father's hair and blows it; it changes into a golden horse. They decide to set a riddle: whoever guesses the horse's origins shall marry the girl. An evil sorcerer overhears their conversation, comes to court the girl and guesses it right. Before she departs, the golden horse advises her to tie a large birch bark on her and let the sorcerer ride ahead. During the journey, the girl rides away with the horse and they are chased by the sorcerer, who only grabs the birch. Both escape to a royal city, where live the sons of Ort-iki. She asks for some food, drink and lodge in Ort-iki's house, and ends up marrying Ort-iki's youngest son. Some time later, the girl's husband has to go to war and borrows the golden horse, and is advised by the girl not to tie the horse to a thick tree trunk. While her husband is away at war, she gives birth to a boy with the moon on a cheek and the sun on the other, and a servant writes a letter to her husband with the good news. The evil sorcerer returns and falsifies a series of letters, with a command to expel the girl and her son from home. Ort-iki's messengers give him the false message, which the girl decides to carry out. She leaves home and wanders off, when her golden horse appears to her, his bridle tied to a thick trunk. The horse tells her it lost all strength, but advises her to cut open its flesh and enter its belly. The next day, she wakes up in a house, and her son shouts at her that his father is coming to visit them. However, the sorcerer appears for a last attack, and the girl cuts off his head with a sword. After burning the sorcerer's corpse, she welcomes her husband into her house.

Americas
Scholar Stanley Lynn Robe located a similar tale in America, published by  José Manuel Espinosa and sourced from New Mexico. In this tale, the devil comes to woo a girl in form of a boy. The girl accompanies him riding her own mule, which helps her escape from the devil by riding through rivers of blood, fire and blades. After they reach another kingdom, the girl disguises herself in male's clothes and the local prince tries to unmask her. The mule helps the girl in two occasions, but on the third the prince discovers the girl and they marry.

Africa
In a Central African folktale collected by missionary Robert Hamill Nassau from the Mpongwe people with the title Leopard of the Fine Skin, in a town named Ra-Mborakinda, princess Ilâmbe demands to be married only to a man who has not any blemish on his skin. Her father, king Mborakinda, dislikes her behaviour, but lets her be. As such, many suitors have come to court her, and many have been spurned. Even animals begin to assume human shape to try to court her, until it is Leopard's turn. Leopard meets an old doctor named Ra-Marânge, who directs him to a sorcered named Ogula-ya-mpazya-vazya. The sorcerer prepares a medicine for Leopard and he becomes a human called Ogula-Njĕgâ. In human form, he goes to Ra-Mborakinda to court Ilâmbe, who falls in love with him since his body has not any spot or blemish. A marriage is arranged between them, but King Mborakinda, through his okove (a magic fetish), senses something evil regarding his daughter's marriage and pushes her aside for a talk: he gives her a key and tells her to unlock a house, where she will find two Kabala (magic horses) and she must choose the lame-looking one. Despite her questions, she obeys her father and takes the lame horse with her, along with a retinue of servants. On the road, Ogula-Njĕgâ, still feeling his animal instints despite being in human shape, tells his wife he go ahead of her; at a distance, he changes into a leopard, hunts some prey, then returns to his human wife as a human male. Some time later, the retinue arrives at Leopard's village, where all animals have transformed into humans by some magic. Princess Ilâmbe falls into a routine where she stays at home, while Ogula-Njĕgâ lies he has business in another town, turns into a leopard to hunt prey, then comes home. Time passes, and Ilâmbe wishes to have aa food-plantation and orders her servants to dig up the ground, but her servants start disappearing - her husband's doing. After many disappearances, Ilâmbe begins to feel lonely and pets her Horse as a friend. The horse begins to speak in a human voice and tells her the servants have been devoured by her husband, and that, after her close maidservants vanish too, she will be the last. It happens as the horse described; the horse then advises Ilâmbe to prepare three gourds: one with ground-nuts, the second with gourd seeds and the third with water. The next day, Ogula-Njĕgâ's mother tells him she suspects something about his wife and the horse, but sleeps next to her. The following day, Ogula-Njĕgâ goes about his "business"; while he is away, Ilâmbe escapes with her Horse and the gourds. Ogula-Njĕgâ comes home and, noticing his wife's absence, turns into a leopard and rushes after her. The Horse senses the pursuit and orders Ilâmbe to throw the gourds behind them, one after the other: the Leopard eats the contents of the first two and the third breaks apart and creates a large stream between them. The Horse brings Ilâmbe to another village where only men may enter, and changes her gender to a male. Ilâmbe rides the Horse into the village and takes shelter with a youth, who begins to suspect the newcomer is a woman, not a man, so he sets tests to unmask their gender: to bathe in the river with the men. With the horse's magic, Ilâmbe truly becomes a man and avoids any discovery. Later, the Horse asks her to shoot him, cut up his flesh and burn it, then take his ashes and scatter them outside the village. Ilâmbe follows the horse's instructions: she turns back into a woman, and mounted on Horse. They return to Ra-Mborakinda and Ilâmbe sees the error of her behaviour.

Adaptations 

British author Alan Garner developed a literary treatment of the narrative with the tale The Princess and the Golden Mane. In this tale, a princess falls in love with a stableboy, much to her father's, the king, disgust. They marry in secret, and he has to leave her. Before he departs, the stableboy tells his wife she will bear twins, a boy and a girl, and she can trust a golden-maned white horse from the stable to save her and their children. The king learns of the pregnancy and orders his knights to search far and wide for the stableboy, to no avail. Time passes. As petty revenge against his daughter, the king fattens a louse until it is large enough, kills it and uses its hide as part of a riddle: anyone who can guess the animal the hide belongs to, shall marry the princess. A strange beggarman comes to court and guesses it right. Fearing for her children, the princess consults with the golden-maned horse, which advises her to take it with her, since the beggarman will want to take only the children. Despite the king's protests, the princess joins the beggarman with the horse and her children. The group reaches a castle, but go behind it and enter a cave hidden by a large rock; the beggarman now transformed into a large ogre. After discovering the true nature of the beggarman, the princess takes her children and rides away on the horse . The ogre rushes behind them, but the horse advises the princess to throw behind her objects to create magical obstacles: a rose (that creates a wall of fire); a peck of salt (that becomes a mountain of glass); a comb (that creates a thorny forest of bronze) and a golden mirror (that creates a lake). On the other side of the lake, the ogre ties a large stone around his neck and begins his swim across the lake to reach the princess on the other side. The horse enters the lake and fights the ogre to the death, so intense their battle that the lake dries up. After the fight, the horse tells the princess to kill it, and throw its ribs towards the sun, its head towards the moon, and its legs to the "four horizons of the sky". The princess obeys its orders; the legs create four golden poplar trees with emerald leaves; the ribs change into a golden castle, with villages and meadows, and the head becomes a silver river. Sailing down the river is a golden boat, with her husband, the stableboy.

See also
 Horse sacrifice
 Calumniated Wife
 The Three Golden Children (folklore)
 Vasilisa the Priest's Daughter
 Ileana Simziana (Romanian folktale)
 The Black Colt (Iranian folkale)
 The Magician's Horse (Lithuanian folktale)

References 

Georgian folklore
Fictional horses
Horses in culture
Female characters in fairy tales